Estonia elects a legislature on the national level. The Riigikogu has 101 members, elected for a four-year term by proportional representation. A head of state – the president – is elected for a five-year term by parliament (1st–3rd round) or an electoral college (4th and subsequent rounds). Locally, Estonia elects local government councils, which vary in size. Election law states the minimum size of a council depending on the size of municipality. Local government councils are elected by proportional representation too.
The minimum number of council members is prescribed to be at least 7 seats
Over 2,000 inhabitants: at least 13 seats
Over 5,000 inhabitants: at least 17 seats
Over 10,000 inhabitants: at least 21 seats
Over 50,000 inhabitants: at least 31 seats
Over 300,000 inhabitants: at least 79 seats

Estonia has a multi-party system with numerous parties. Often no one party has the chance to gain power alone and parties must work with each other to form coalition governments.

Public elections have taken place in the following years:
Past elections:
Riigikogu (parliament): 1920, 1923, 1926, 1929, 1932, 1936, 1938, 1940, 1992, 1995, 1999, 2003, 2007, 2011, 2015, 2019, 2023
Local/municipal: 1993, 1996, 1999, 2002, 2005, 2009, 2013, 2017
European parliament: 2004, 2009, 2014, 2019
Referendums: 2003 (EU)
President: 1992 (Presidential elections since 1996 have taken place in Riigikogu or Electoral College)

Voting
Residents without Estonian citizenship may not elect the Riigikogu (the national parliament). Residents without citizenship of any European Union member state may not elect the European Parliament. All permanent residents, regardless of citizenship, are eligible to vote in the local (municipal) elections in Estonia.

Electronic voting is based on the Estonian ID card. Every voter has the right to verify and change their vote electronically. If the voter has also voted with a ballot paper, then only the ballot paper will be taken into account.

Latest national election

European elections
 European Parliament election, 2004
 European Parliament election, 2009
 European Parliament election, 2014 
 European Parliament election, 2019

Referendums
The Constitution of Estonia gives the Parliament of Estonia the power to submit a bill or other national issue to a referendum (article 105 of the Constitution). The result of the vote is binding. If a bill which is submitted to a referendum does not receive a majority of votes in favour, the President of the Republic shall declare extraordinary elections to the Parliament.

There are some issues which cannot be submitted to the referendum: issues regarding the budget, taxation, financial obligations of the state, ratification and denunciation of international treaties, the declaration or termination of a state of emergency, or national defence (article 105 of the Constitution).

Some parts of the Constitution (chapters "General Provisions" and "Amendment of the Constitution") can be amended only by a referendum (article 162 of the Constitution). The rest of Constitution can be amended either by
 a referendum;
 two successive memberships of the Parliament;
 the Parliament, as a matter of urgency (article 163 of the Constitution).
A three-fifths majority of the membership of the Parliament is required to submit a bill to amend the Constitution to a referendum (article 164 of the Constitution).

A referendum was called by the Parliament of Estonia on 2 occasions since Estonia regained independence from the USSR.
 a referendum on a new constitution and citizenship in 1992
 Estonian European Union membership referendum in 2003
Also, there was a referendum on the restoration of Estonian independence in 1991 while Estonia was still under Soviet occupation.

See also
 Electoral districts of Estonia
 Electoral calendar
 Electoral system
 Electronic voting in Estonia

External links
 History of the RiigiKogu
 Adam Carr's Election Archive
 Parties and elections
 National Electoral Committee of Estonia
 NSD: European Election Database - Estonia publishes regional level election data; allows for comparisons of election results, 1992-2007

References